Aspilapteryx limosella is a moth of the family Gracillariidae. It is found from Germany and Poland to the Iberian Peninsula, Italy and Greece. It is also found in central and southern Russia.

The larvae feed on Teucrium chamaedrys, Teucrium montanum and Jurinia cyanoides. They mine the leaves of their host plant. The mine is a lower-surface tentiform mine. The upper surface is often purple brown, while the lower surface is pale green. The frass is deposited in a corner of the mine. The larva moves to a new mine three or four times, depending on the size of the leaf. Usually, the larva pupates in a cocoon within the mine, but sometimes the larva leaves the mine and lives freely for a while before pupating externally.

References

Aspilapteryx
Moths of Europe
Moths described in 1843